Asplundia sparrai is a species of plant in the Cyclanthaceae family. It is endemic to Ecuador.  Its natural habitat is subtropical or tropical moist montane forests.

References

Flora of Ecuador
sparrai
Vulnerable plants
Taxonomy articles created by Polbot
Taxobox binomials not recognized by IUCN